Kakoli Ghosh Dastidar (born 23 November 1959) is an Indian physician and politician from West Bengal. She is Chairperson of Banga Janani Bahini, a women's wing of All India Trinamool Congress. She is a member of 15th, 16th and 17th Lok Sabha, re-elected in 2014 Indian general election and 2019.

Early life
Kakoli Ghosh  was born on 23 November 1959. Her family has had a connection to West Bengal and Indian politics and government for three generations. Her maternal grandfather served as the postmaster general of West Bengal. Her paternal uncle, the late Arun Moitra, was a freedom fighter and a former Pradesh Congress President. Her maternal uncle, Gurudas Dasgupta, was also a Member of the Indian Parliament.

Early in his career, Mr. Moitra built his family farm in Digberia of Barasat in North 24 Parganas District of West Bengal. Member of Parliament (MP) Ghosh grew up  at her family's farm. Her husband, Sudarshan Ghosh Dastidar, is also a physician and a politician. They have two sons.

Education
Kakoli Ghosh gained her medical degree from R. G. Kar Medical College and Hospital, Kolkata, which was then affiliated with the University of Calcutta. She also did a Post Graduate Training in Obstetric Ultrasound from King's College London.

Career
She is now a member of the Committee on Home Affairs in the Lok Sabha (People's Chamber) of the Indian Parliament.

Ghosh Dastidar grew up in a socio-political environment. Alongside having a family legacy of public service, the MP dedicated her life to serving the people of her community including providing health care for slum-dwelling citizens. She also helped implement a school and dispensary in South 24 Parganas for the children of trafficked women.

In 2009 Lok Sabha elections, she won from Barasat (Lok Sabha constituency) by a margin of 1,22,901 votes. She had earlier lost the elections from Diamond Harbour (Lok Sabha constituency), Howrah (Lok Sabha constituency) and Ballyganj assembly constituency.

Controversies

Park Street Rape Case
When protests and demonstrations were at the peak for justice in 2012 Delhi gang rape case Ghosh Dastidar made very baseless and insensitive allegations against the Park Street Gang Rape victim. She said that the 'incident at Park Street was not a rape at all'. While making claim that the Park Street case and Delhi case cannot be compared she described Park Street case as a 'misunderstanding between a lady and her client,' thereby suggesting that the victim is a sex worker.

References

Alumni of King's College London
Living people
Politicians from Kolkata
West Bengal politicians
India MPs 2009–2014
Trinamool Congress politicians from West Bengal
1959 births
University of Calcutta alumni
Lok Sabha members from West Bengal
People from Barasat
India MPs 2014–2019
Women in West Bengal politics
Women members of the Lok Sabha
Indian National Congress politicians from West Bengal
India MPs 2019–present
21st-century Indian women politicians
21st-century Indian politicians